Mark Williams is an American film director, writer, and producer.

Selected filmography

Film

Television

References

External links 

Living people
American film directors
American male screenwriters
American film producers
Year of birth missing (living people)
Place of birth missing (living people)